Madda can be:
 Madda is an Indian surname
 A form of Madra, a region and kingdom in ancient India
an Arabic word, used in Egypt, for falaka (corporal punishment on the feet)
a type of harakat in the Arabic script
the name of a king, see Uttarakuru 
the Afghan Madda khel tribe
in contemporary Jewish orthodox thought on Divine Providence, knowledge of the functioning of nature and society. Also used to mean science. 
a nickname for people with the name Madeline
Madda is UK Drum & Bass MC and Vocal Artist 
a delightful Susan after a few drinks catching up with friends